The Hyperion Lyceum is a secondary school in Amsterdam which offers both gymnasium and atheneum streams. It opened in fall 2011; since 2012 it has been located in Overhoeks in Amsterdam-Noord, in a temporary modular building designed for it by Burton Hamfelt Architectuur. The school is distinguished by using cross-curricular projects for some of the instruction, and offers special courses in great thinkers, lifestyle informatics, drama, and logic and rhetoric. Since 2018 it is located at Badhuiskade 361, Amsterdam-Noord.

References

Schools in Amsterdam
Educational institutions established in 2011
2011 establishments in the Netherlands